Luis de Milán (also known as Lluís del Milà or Luys Milán) (c. 1500 – c. 1561) was a Spanish Renaissance composer, vihuelist, and writer on music. He was the first composer in history to publish music for the vihuela de mano, an instrument employed primarily in the Iberian peninsula and some of the Italian states during the 15th and 16th centuries, and he was also one of the first musicians to specify verbal tempo indications in his music.

He probably lived all his life in Valencia, though details are sketchy at best.  He seems to have been employed by the ducal court until around 1538.  In 1535 he published his first book, a parlor game with music called El juego de mandar. The next year he issued what would be his most important book.

El Maestro (1536) 
Milán’s Libro de música de vihuela de mano intitulado El Maestro was printed in December 1536 and dedicated to King John III of Portugal. The dedication, and the inclusion of six villancicos in Portuguese, suggests that Milán traveled to that country and spent time there.

El Maestro is the first collection of vihuela music in history, and was in part intended for students of the instrument, with scores presented in grades from simple to complex so that vihuelists could proceed from elementary to harder pieces. The set divides into two books, one for the vihuela alone and the other for voice and vihuela. (A breakdown of its 72 works is at Spanish Wikipedia.) There are forty fantasías, six pavanas, and four tientos in the instrumental volume. For voice, there are twelve villancicos, four romances, and six sonetos (sonnets). All of these are to Castilian texts, except for the sonetos, which are in Italian, and half of the villancicos, as already noted.

Much of the collection requires considerable virtuosity. Still, not all the ornamentation is provided in detail.  The style of the compositions varies from simple homophony to polyphony and virtuoso passage-work; unusual chromaticism also occurs, including strange double-inflections which were quite rare in music from other parts of Europe at the same time.  It appears that the book was prepared with great care; alternative passages are given for players who wish to avoid more virtuosic parts, sections of pieces are indicated as optional, and he provided descriptive tempo indications, for example, ni muy apriessa ni muy a espacio sino con un compás bien mesurado ("neither too quickly nor too slowly, but with a moderate measure").

Late works 
Milán’s last publication, El cortesano (1561), modeled on Il Cortegiano by Baldassare Castiglione, gives a vivid and entertaining picture of life in the Valencian ducal court.  While it contains no music, it is a valuable account by a professional musician at the time.

Legacy 
The music of Luis de Milán is popular with performers on the present-day classical guitar because it can be adapted very easily to their instrument.

Bibliography
Articles "Vihuela" and "Luis de Milán," in The New Grove Dictionary of Music and Musicians, ed. Stanley Sadie.  20 vol.  London, Macmillan Publishers Ltd., 1980.  
 Ruggero Chiesa: Luys Milán: El Maestro, Zerboni, Milano 1974 (commentary and transcription for guitar)
 Luis Gásser: Luis Milán on Sixteenth-Century Performance Practice, Indiana University Press, Bloomington & Indianapolis 1996
 John Griffiths: Luys Milán, The New Grove, New York 2001
 Ralf Jarchow: Luys Milán – El Maestro, Vol. 1–3, Jarchow, Glinde 1995 (commentary and transcription for guitar; German and English translation of Milán)
 Gustave Reese: Music in the Renaissance.  New York, W.W. Norton & Co., 1954.  
 John M. Ward: The Vihuela de Mano and its Music (1536-1576), New York 1953 (Dissertation)

Recordings

 Luis de Milán interpreted by Jordi Savall, 
 Listen online (Magnatune) to "El Maestro" performed by Edward Martin or by Jacob Heringman and Catherine King.
2005 – Dulcis Melancholia. Biographie musicale de Marguerite d’Autriche. Capilla Flamenca. MEW 0525. Contains a recording of Pavane 4 and Pavane 5 (La bella franceschina) by Luis Milan.

External links

Sheetmusic
Libro de musica de vihuela de mano, intitulado El Maestro (click "View options" JPG icon) - Biblioteca Nacional de España info

1500s births
1561 deaths
Renaissance composers
Composers for the classical guitar
Spanish male classical composers
Spanish classical composers
Vihuela players